Maha Phruettharam is one of the five khwaeng (subdistrict) of Bang Rak District, Bangkok.

History
The subdistrict is named after the local temple, Wat Maha Phruettharam Worawihan (วัดมหาพฤฒารามวรวิหาร), or known in short as Wat Maha Phruettharam, the third grade temple of worawihan, an old monastery whose exact origin is unknown, originally named Wat Tha Kwian (วัดท่าเกวียน).

The name of temple is derived from the legend about the legendary king of Ayutthaya era, U-thong (the legendary king was not King U-Thong, founder of the Ayutthaya Kingdom). He had escaped cholera which was seriously spreading at the time. He travelled by kwian (wagon) and came to park his wagon in the area, but was told that area was the resting place from the travellers who travelled by the kwian.

Later, King Mongkut (Rama IV) named the temple Wat Takien (วัดตะเคียน), and he jointly built the new temple with his son, Prince Chulalongkorn (later King Chulalongkorn or Rama V). The temple was renovated and being raised to the royal temple and was renamed Wat Maha Phruettharam Worawihan by King Chulalongkorn.

This temple is regarded as one of the oldest and most remarkable temples in the area. Highlights of this temple include walls of the ordination hall are covered with beautiful murals depict the 13 ascetic practices of Buddhism from just above the floor right up to the ceiling, regarded as different from other temples, and in the third building, the sanctuary with a 19 m (62 ft) reclining Buddha in gold. Considered as the second largest reclining Buddha after the reclining Buddha of Wat Pho in Rattanakosin Island.

The temple situated on the left side of Maha Phruettharam Road, a short road that separates from Rama IV Road inbound at Hua Lamphong Intersection opposite to Bangkok Railway Station, more commonly known as Hua Lamphong, at the corner of Charoen Sawat 36 Bridge and parallel to Khlong Phadung Krung Kasem canal southward and bend slightly towards the west before terminates at the foot of Phitthaya Sathian Bridge, where it combines Charoen Krung Road. The road is located on the edge of Bang Rak and Samphanthawong Districts. It is served by only one BMTA's bus line 1.

Geography
Maha Phruettharam can be considered the northernmost area of the district.

Neighbouring subdistricts are (from the north clockwise): Pom Prap of Pom Prap Sattru Phai District, Rong Mueang and Wang Mai of Pathum Wan District (Khlong Phadung Krung Kasem and Rama IV Road are the divider lines), Si Phraya and Bang Rak in its district (Si Phraya and Charoen Krung Roads are the divider lines), Talat Noi of Samphanthawong District (Khlong Phadung Krung Kasem is a divider line).

Demography
In 2017 it had a total population of 11,609 people (5,396 men, 6,213 women) in 6,551 households.

Places

Important places
Wat Maha Phruettharam Worawihan
Mahaprutharam Girls' School
Wat Kaew Jam Fah (Wat Kaew Fah Lang)
Siphraya Polytechnic College
Mandarin Hotel Bangkok
Central Labour Court and Pathum Wan District Court
Sapanluang Church
The Second Church Samyan
Hua Lamphong MRT Station (entrance 1, 4)
Bangkok Centre Hotel

Transportation
Rama IV Road
Si Phraya Road
Maha Phruettharam Road
Maha Nakhon Road

References

Subdistricts of Bangkok
Bang Rak district